Robot City may refer to:

Robot City, a fictional city in the movie Robots
Robot City, a computer game developed by Brooklyn Multimedia and released in 1995